The Capilano Courier is the student newspaper at Capilano University, a public university in the District of North Vancouver, British Columbia, Canada. First published in 1968, the Capilano Courier is staffed by students and alumni operating independently of the university's administration and the Capilano Students' Union. It is published weekly by the Capilano Courier Publishing Society. The Capilano Courier is a member of Canadian University Press. The Capilano Courier reports on news, sports, campus life, arts and a variety of national and international topics in their opinions and features. The Capilano Courier also publishes a weekly calendar, editorial, reviews and horoscopes.

Incoming Editors-in-Chief are voted in by the prior year's editorial staff and contributors, who must be members of the Capilano Courier Publishing Society.

Reformatting  
In 2019, the Courier announced that it would be changing to a monthly magazine format.

In the summer of 2021, the Courier revamped their website.

During the 2021-22 publication year, the Courier added an Indigenous News section along with a Communities section to their magazine.

Editors-in-Chief
 2004-2005: Erin Millar
 2007-2008: Cole Robertson
 2008-2009: Christine McLaren
 2009-2010: Alamir Novin and Kevin Murray
 2010-2011: Giles Roy
 2011-2012: Sarah Vitet and Samantha Thompson
 2012-2013: JJ Brewis
 2013-2015: Leah Scheitel
 2015-2017: Andy Rice
 2017-2018: Carlo Javier
 2018-2019: Christine Beyleveldt
 2019-2020: Rachel D'Sa
 2020-2021: Ana Maria Caicedo
 2021-2023: Alisha Samnani

See also
List of newspapers in Canada
List of student newspapers in Canada

References

External links
 

Student newspapers published in British Columbia
Courier
Newspapers published in Vancouver
Publications established in 1968
1968 establishments in British Columbia
Weekly newspapers published in British Columbia